View Royal is a town in Greater Victoria and a member municipality of the Capital Regional District of British Columbia, Canada. View Royal has a population of 11,575 residents.

History 
View Royal's history is closely linked to the entire region. The Esquimalt First Nation, a Coast Salish indigenous peoples, have occupied View Royal since time immemorial. It began when early inhabitants of today's Esquimalt Harbour crossed an isthmus, now Portage Park, to harvest seafood in Portage Inlet. 

European settlement began in the 1850s by Kenneth Mackenzie who established a farm known as Craigflower Manor. In the mid-19th century, Dr. John Helmcken, Vancouver Island's first doctor and later speaker of the British Columbia Legislative Assembly, paid the Hudson's Bay Company $5 per acre for hundreds of acres of land between Esquimalt Harbour and what is now Victoria General Hospital. The land was cleared for Victoria's growth. In 1912, the Island Investment Company bought  of land below Four Mile Hill, fronting the harbour, from Dr. Helmcken’s son James. They marketed lots as “View Royal” because of their "royal view", which gave the town its name.

View Royal remained unorganized for over half a century. By the 1950s, things had begun to change. In 1959, a group of residents in the Shoreline Drive area circulated a petition urging annexation by Esquimalt. Several studies and referendums came and went, but View Royal continued with its unorganized status. In 1966, the Capital Regional District emerged, bringing with it regional approaches for such service deliveries as sewage collection. Then a Price Waterhouse study presented three options: status quo, union with Esquimalt, or incorporation as a town. The town’s incorporation became official on December 5, 1988.

Many historic sites still exist in View Royal, including:
 Four Mile Pub & Six Mile Pub: two historic "road houses" or pubs that have existed for approximately 150 years. 
 Craigflower Manor & Schoolhouse: one of Canada's National Historic Sites. Completed in 1856, the Manor site was one of four original farms set up by the Hudson's Bay Company as part of their obligations in settling Vancouver Island. The site housed the McKenzie family in the Manor as well as twenty other dwellings, a sawmill, a flour mill, a blacksmith's shop, a brick kiln, a slaughterhouse, and a general store.  The Craigflower Schoolhouse, the companion adjacent site to the Manor, is located across a municipal border. The two properties are located at the intersection of Admirals Road, Craigflower Road, and Island Highway.

Present day 
View Royal is divided into eight neighbourhoods based on topography, transportation corridors, natural environment, and the age of housing stock. These neighbourhoods are Atkins, Burnside, Craigflower, Harbour, Helmcken, Hospital, Thetis, and Wilfert. In 2011, there were almost 4,140 housing units in the town with a median population age of 44.1 years, which compares to the CRD at 44.8.

View Royal's shoreline includes sandy beaches with small caves, large driftwood, and rocks, which are home to starfish, crabs, seals, and other marine life.

Several changes have gone on in View Royal in recent years, including the completion of the Island Highway Improvement Project in 2011, which included new cycle lanes, sidewalks, turning lanes, and planted medians. Beginning in 2013, the Town of View Royal and District of Saanich replaced the 80-year-old Craigflower Bridge and approach roads, and construction began on the new Public Safety Building, scheduled to be complete in fall 2014.

Demographics

Ethnicity

Religion 
According to the 2021 census, religious groups in View Royal included:
Irreligion (6,535 persons or 58.0%)
Christianity (3,890 persons or 34.5%)
Islam (195 persons or 1.7%)
Hinduism (185 persons or 1.6%)
Sikhism (170 persons or 1.5%)
Buddhism (90 persons or 0.8%)
Judaism (40 persons or 0.4%)
Other (165 persons or 1.5%)

Notes

References

External links 

Populated places on the British Columbia Coast
Towns in British Columbia
Populated places in the Capital Regional District
Greater Victoria